Ripon is a future Altamont Corridor Express station in the city of the same name. The platform will be located between the railway right of way and U.S. Highway 99, south of the Main Street interchange. Access to the platform will be via a pedestrian overcrossing southwest over the tracks to South Industrial Avenue. It was expected to open to revenue service in 2024 as a station along the first phase of ACE's expansion to Merced, but was later delayed to 2027.

References

Future Altamont Corridor Express stations
Railway stations scheduled to open in 2027
Altamont Corridor Express stations in San Joaquin County, California